Marcel Bouraine (1886–1948) was a French sculptor. He is known for his work in the Art Deco-era, specifically small statuettes, lamps, bookends, and radiator figures.

Biography 
Marcel Bouraine was born in 1886 in Pontoise, Île-de-France, France. He studied sculpture under the direction of Joseph-Alexandre Falguière. He exhibited at the Salon des Artistes Français, the Salon d'Automne, and the Salon des Tuileries (1922). 

During World War I, Bouraine was a prisoner of war and was taken to Switzerland. He later studied at École Supérieure des Beaux-Arts, Genève.

Bouraine's work was part of the sculpture event in the art competition at the 1924 Summer Olympics. In 1928, he designed statuettes in pâte de verre for glass manufacturer Gabriel Argy-Rousseau. He exhibited two large sculptures at the Exposition Internationale des Arts et Techniques dans la Vie Moderne of 1937 in Paris.

Bouraine's work can be found in museum collections, including at the Art Institute of Chicago, and the Norwich Castle Museum and Art Gallery.

References

Further reading
 "Bouraine, Marcel". In: Hans Vollmer (ed.): Allgemeines Lexikon der bildenden Künstler des XX. Jahrhunderts. Band 1: A–D. E. A. Seemann, Leipzig 1953, p. 284
 "Bouraine, Marcel – Sculptor, potter". In: Bénézit Dictionary of Artists. Band 2: Bedeschini–Bulow. Gründ, Paris 2006, p. 1014 ([doi:10.1093/benz/9780199773787.article.B00024457 online version: access by subscription])
 Alberto Shayo: Statuettes art deco period. Antique Collectors Club 2016, p. 54
 Eric Knowles: Art Deco. Bloomsbury Publishing, 2014, p.167
 Victor Arwas: Glass. Art Nouveau to Art Deco. H. N. Abrams, New York 1987, p. 32
 Robert E. Dechant, Filipp Goldscheider: Goldscheider. Firmengeschichte und Werkverzeichnis. Arnoldsche Art Publishers, Stuttgart 2007, . pp. 234 ff., 557
 Gerald Hunze: "Bouraine, Marcel". In: Allgemeines Künstlerlexikon. Die Bildenden Künstler aller Zeiten und Völker (AKL). Band 13, Saur, München u. a. 1996, p. 353

1886 births
1948 deaths
20th-century French sculptors
20th-century French male artists
French male sculptors
Olympic competitors in art competitions
People from Pontoise
Alumni of the École Supérieure des Beaux-Arts, Genève